Żabowo may refer to the following places:
Żabowo, Masovian Voivodeship (east-central Poland)
Żabowo, Pomeranian Voivodeship (north Poland)
Żabowo, West Pomeranian Voivodeship (north-west Poland)